Thoen is a district (amphoe) in the southern part of Lampang province, northern Thailand.

Geography
Neighboring districts are (from the north clockwise): Soem Ngam, Sop Prap of Lampang Province, Wang Chin of Phrae province, Si Satchanalai, Thung Saliam, Ban Dan Lan Hoi of Sukhothai province, Ban Tak, Sam Ngao of Tak province, Mae Phrik of Lampang Province again, Li and Thung Hua Chang of Lamphun province. 

Mae Wa National Park is in the western part of the district at the southern end of the Khun Tan Range. The Phi Pan Nam Mountains dominate the landscape of the eastern side of the district.

History
In 1938 the district was renamed from Mueang Thoen (เมืองเถิน) to Thoen, as only the capital districts were supposed to have the term Mueang in their name.

Administration
The district is divided into eight subdistricts (tambons), which are further subdivided into 90 villages (mubans). Wiang Mok and Lom Rat are the two subdistrict municipalities (thesaban tambons), each covering parts of the same-named tambon. There are a further six tambon administrative organizations (TAO).

References

External links
amphoe.com (Thai)

Thoen